Elisabeth Kopp (born 16 December 1936, in Zürich) is a Swiss politician and the first woman elected to the Swiss Federal Council (1984–1989).

Biography
Elisabeth Kopp grew up in Bern. After finishing her law studies in 1960, she married Hans W. Kopp (1931–2009). In 1969, she was elected to the district council (Gemeinderat) of Zumikon and, from 1972, she served on the education council (Erziehungsrat) of the canton of Zürich. She was president of Zumikon from 1974 until her election as a federal councillor in 1984. As a member of the Free Democratic Party, she served in the National Council of Switzerland from 1979 to 1984.

In 1984, Rudolf Friedrich resigned from his office for health reasons. The Free Democratic Party then nominated Elisabeth Kopp and Bruno Hunziker as Friedrich's successor. After this nomination, the Swiss media started a campaign against Elisabeth Kopp, focusing mainly on her husband Hans W. Kopp. But shortly before the Federal Council held the election, the tides turned with some journalists insisting that Elisabeth Kopp should not be held liable for the faults of her husband.

On 2 October 1984, she was elected to the Federal Council as the first woman ever in that office. She got elected with the first ballot, receiving 124 votes of 244. During her time in office, she held the Federal Department of Justice and Police and was Vice-President of the Confederation shortly in 1989.

Her husband Hans W. Kopp was member of many company boards. He was vice president of Shakarchi Trading AG, among others. In September 1988, Jacques-André Kaeslin made a note about the connection of Shakarchi Trading AG with international crime. Keaslin delivered the note to Renate Schwob, an employee of the Federal Department of Justice and Police, under circumstances which are not entirely clear. In October, Katharina Schoop, a personal assistant of Elisabeth Kopp, was allowed to see the note. The information was then relayed to Kopp, who phoned her husband, telling him to retire from his work at Shakarchi Trading AG. Shakarchi Trading AG was later proven to be innocent of any criminal involvement.

On 9 December 1988, the Swiss newspaper Le Matin wrote about that phone call. Elisabeth Kopp then confessed her involvement, which led to the Swiss media demanding her resignation. On 12 December 1988, Kopp announced that she would resign at the end of February 1989, insisting that she was without guilt in the matter. Pressure was raised again and Kopp finally announced her immediate resignation on 12 January 1989.

Literature 
 
 Elisabeth Kopp (1991). Briefe (Letters). Benteli Verlag.

Film 
 :  (A Winters Journey – Switzerlands first female Minister)'', documentary, 85 min., Topic Film, January 2007

References

External links

 
 
 Der Fall Kopp 
 afz.ethz.ch 

|-

|-

Members of the National Council (Switzerland)
Members of the Federal Council (Switzerland)
1936 births
Living people
Politicians from Zürich
Women members of the National Council (Switzerland)
Women members of the Federal Council (Switzerland)
20th-century Swiss politicians
20th-century Swiss women politicians
20th-century women rulers
Female justice ministers